Khodayyir Abbas was Minister of Health in the cabinet appointed by the Interim Iraq Governing Council in September 2003. A Shia Muslim and surgeon, member of the UK Royal College of Surgeons, he is a member of the Daawa Party.

References
 

Government ministers of Iraq
Possibly living people
Year of birth missing (living people)
Iraqi Shia Muslims
Islamic Dawa Party politicians